The 2015 Waco Showdown was a professional tennis tournament played on outdoor hard courts. It was the first edition of the tournament and part of the 2015 ITF Women's Circuit, offering a total of $50,000 in prize money. It took place in Waco, United States, on 2–8 November 2015.

Singles main draw entrants

Seeds 

 1 Rankings as of 26 October 2015

Other entrants 
The following players received wildcards into the singles main draw:
  Jennifer Brady
  Kiah Generette
  Vania King
  Elizabeth Profit

The following players received entry from the qualifying draw:
  Paula Cristina Gonçalves
  Barbara Haas
  Florencia Molinero
  Ana Sofía Sánchez

The following player received entry by a special exempt:
  Jovana Jakšić

Champions

Singles

 Viktorija Golubic def.  Nicole Gibbs, 6–2, 6–1

Doubles

 Nicole Gibbs /  Vania King def.  Julia Glushko /  Rebecca Peterson, 6–4, 6–4

External links 
 2015 Waco Showdown at ITFtennis.com
 

2015 ITF Women's Circuit
2015
2015 in American tennis